Amjad Hussain (‎; 1888–1961), better known by the pen-name Amjad Hyderabadi, was an Urdu and Persian Ruba'i poet from Hyderabad, India. In Urdu poetic circles he is also known as Hakim-al-Shuara.

During the rule of Nizam of Hyderabad, a flood occurred on 28 September 1908) on the River Musi. Hyderabadi was one of the 150 people who saved their lives by hanging on to the branches of a tamarind tree. He later wrote a poem "Qayamat-e-Soghra" (The Minor Doomsday) detailing his experience. To commemorate the 100th anniversary of the tragedy, Satyanarayana Danish recited this poem.

The Warsi Brothers, an Indian Qawwali musical group, regularly recited his poems in their Qawali in various countries.

Life
Hyderabadi was born in Hyderabad Deccan into a small family.

He saw his entire family, including his mother, wife and daughter get washed away in the Musi River flood of 1908 and he was the only survivor in his family. Most of his Ruba'i reflects his depression at the loss of his family. This is an example:

Amjad Hyderabadi Urdu Books
 Rubayat Amjad Hyderabadi
 Adabi ijlas wo Mushaera

Books on Amjad Hyderabadi
 Hakeem Al Shuara Amjaad Hyderabadi
 Masterpieces of Urdu Rubaiyat by K C Kanda.

See also

List of Urdu-language poets
Siraj Aurangabadi
Hyderabadi Muslims

References

Further reading

External links
Famous Nazam '''Banday ho Agar Rab Kay to rab Say Mango

1888 births
1961 deaths
Persian-language poets
Hyderabadi Muslims
Urdu-language poets from India
Writers from Hyderabad, India
20th-century Indian poets
Indian male poets
20th-century Indian male writers
Poets from Telangana